is a Japanese football player for Thespakusatsu Gunma.

Club statistics
Updated to 23 February 2016.

References

External links

Profile at Thespakusatsu Gunma

1995 births
Living people
Association football people from Osaka Prefecture
Sportspeople from Osaka
Japanese footballers
J1 League players
J2 League players
J3 League players
Vissel Kobe players
Albion Park White Eagles players
Thespakusatsu Gunma players
J.League U-22 Selection players
Association football midfielders
Association football forwards
Japanese expatriate footballers
Expatriate soccer players in Australia
Naturalized citizens of Japan
Japanese people of Korean descent